Andy Burgin (born 6 March 1947) is an English former professional footballer who played as a full back, making over 300 career appearances.

Career
Born in Sheffield, Burgin played for Sheffield Wednesday, Rotherham United, Detroit Cougars, Halifax Town and Blackburn Rovers.

References

1947 births
Living people
English footballers
Sheffield Wednesday F.C. players
Rotherham United F.C. players
Halifax Town A.F.C. players
Blackburn Rovers F.C. players
English Football League players
North American Soccer League (1968–1984) players
Detroit Cougars (soccer) players
Association football fullbacks
English expatriate sportspeople in the United States
Expatriate soccer players in the United States
English expatriate footballers